Huixing is a station on Line 3 of Chongqing Rail Transit in Chongqing Municipality, China. It is located in Yubei District. It opened in 2011.

Station structure

Nearby station
Xingke Ave. station on Line 9: 400 meters (5 minute walking time) from this station.

References

Yubei District
Railway stations in Chongqing
Railway stations in China opened in 2011
Chongqing Rail Transit stations